Zaļenieki Parish is an administrative unit in the western part of Jelgava Municipality in the Semigallia region of Latvia.
It borders the Parishes of Glūda, Svēte, Lielplatone, Vilce, Tērvete,  and Augstkalne. 
Rivers Auce, Dorupīte, Eglone, Svēte, and Tērvete flow through Zaļenieki.

Towns, villages and settlements of Zaļenieki parish 
Zaļenieki, Spurģi, Ūziņi, Apgunste.

Notable people 
 Poet Aspazija (1865 - 1943) was born in Daukšas, Zaļenieki Parish

Parishes of Latvia
Jelgava Municipality
Semigallia